Cinidius was the first bishop of Vic who is mentioned by name in records that have come down to the present.  He was involved in the council of Tarragona and Girona in 516.

6th-century bishops in the Visigothic Kingdom
Year of birth unknown
Year of death unknown

The official web page of the bishop of Vic is this